Central Min, or Min Zhong, is a part of the Min group of varieties of Chinese. It is spoken in the valley of the Sha River in Sanming prefecture in the central mountain areas of Fujian, consisting of Yong'an, the urban area of Sanming (Sanyuan and Meilie districts) and Sha County.

Dialects
Sanming dialect
Yong'an dialect
Shaxian dialect

References 

  (includes a description of the phonology of the Yong'an dialect)

 
Languages of China